Samuel Edward Lees (1843 – 14 June 1916) was an Australian politician.

Born in Sydney to painter and glazier Samuel Lees and Caroline Whitehead, he attended William Street National School but was mostly self-educated. He was apprenticed as a printer and ultimately owned his own printing works from around 1869, expanding into several other interests including building companies in the 1880s. On 30 September 1871 he married Sarah Amy Davies, with whom he had five children. From 1879 to 1909 he was a member of Sydney City Council, serving as mayor in 1895 and 1904. In 1887 he was elected to the New South Wales Legislative Assembly as the Free Trade member for Nepean, serving until 1895 and then again from 1898 to 1901. Lees died in 1916 at Potts Point.

References

 

 

 

1843 births
1916 deaths
Sydney City Councillors
Australian Methodists
Free Trade Party politicians
Mayors and Lord Mayors of Sydney
Members of the New South Wales Legislative Assembly
Members of the New South Wales Legislative Council
Politicians from Sydney
19th-century Australian businesspeople